The men's long jump competition at the 2006 Asian Games in Doha, Qatar was held on 8 and 9 December 2006 at the Khalifa International Stadium.

Schedule
All times are Arabia Standard Time (UTC+03:00)

Records

Results 
Legend
DNS — Did not start
NM — No mark

Qualifying
 Qualification: Qualifying performance 7.60 (Q) or at least 12 best performers (q) advance to the final.

Final

References

External links 
Results – Qualifying Group A
Results – Qualifying Group B

Athletics at the 2006 Asian Games
2006